Mariya Koryttseva and Lilia Osterloh were the defending champions, but chose not to participate that year.

In the final, Nathalie Dechy and Mara Santangelo defeated Nuria Llagostera Vives and Arantxa Parra Santonja, 4–6, 7–6(7–3), [12–10].

Seeds

Draw

Draw

External links
Draw

WTA Auckland Open
2009 WTA Tour